Anatoma flexidentata is a species of sea snail, a marine gastropod mollusc in the family Anatomidae.

Description

Distribution

References

 Geiger D.L. (2012) Monograph of the little slit shells. Volume 1. Introduction, Scissurellidae. pp. 1–728. Volume 2. Anatomidae, Larocheidae, Depressizonidae, Sutilizonidae, Temnocinclidae. pp. 729–1291. Santa Barbara Museum of Natural History Monographs Number 7

Anatomidae
Gastropods described in 2008